In classical scholarship, the editio princeps (plural: editiones principes) of a work is the first printed edition of the work, that previously had existed only in manuscripts, which could be circulated only after being copied by hand. The following is a list of literature works in languages other than Latin or Greek.

References

Textual scholarship
Lists of firsts
Lists of books